The participation of Japan in the ABU TV Song Festival has occurred eleven times since the inaugural ABU TV Song Festival began in 2012. Since their début in 2012, the Japanese entry has been organized by the national broadcaster Japanese Broadcasting Corporation (NHK).

History
NHK is one of the founder members in the ABU TV Song Festivals, having participated in the very first ABU TV Song Festival 2012. On 4 June 2015 NHK confirmed that they would participate in the ABU TV Song Festival 2015 in Istanbul, Turkey. On 13 September 2015 it was announced that the band Scandal would represent Japan with "Sisters".

Participation overview

References 

Countries at the ABU Song Festival